Amylosporomyces is a genus of fungi in the Stereaceae family.

Russulales genera
Stereaceae